Sally Anne Littlejohns (born 20 August 1948) is a British fencer. She competed in the women's team foil event at the 1972 Summer Olympics.

References

1948 births
Living people
British female foil fencers
Olympic fencers of Great Britain
Fencers at the 1972 Summer Olympics